Courtney Anne Ryan (born September 21, 1990) is a  2.0 point American wheelchair basketball player who played with the national team at the 2014 Women's World Wheelchair Basketball Championship in Toronto in 2014. In 2017, she played for the Sydney Metro Blues in the Women's National Wheelchair Basketball League in Australia.

Biography
Courtney Anne Ryan was born in San Diego, California, on September 21, 1990, the daughter of Kevin and Patti Ryan. She has a brother, Chris, and a sister, Caitlin. She attended Coronado High School, where she  played soccer. She was Coronado's Rookie of the Year in 2007 as a junior, and as an education the following year was a first team All-Western League performer, was named to the all-section team, and was Most Valuable Player.

In 2008, she entered Metropolitan State University of Denver, where she played soccer for its team, the Roadrunners. As a freshman, she played 25 games, in which she scored one goal and was credited with seven assists. In 2009, she played 24 games as a defender. She was named first team All-America and first team All-Central Region, and set a school record for defenders with 15 assists on the season.

Ryan played only five games in 2010. During the fifth, against Colorado Mesa University on October 8, 2010,
she was tackled from behind and fell on her back. A blood clot developed that burst and leaked into her spinal cord, leaving her paralysed from the waist down. She stayed at Metro for the 2011 spring semester, then returned to San Diego. She became involved with the Challenged Athletes Foundation, and took up wheelchair basketball.

Pete Hughes, the head coach of the University of Arizona Wildcats women's wheelchair basketball team saw her play a game in which she sank a game-winning buzzer-beater. After the game, he offered her a scholarship. She entered the University of Arizona in the fall of 2012. She enrolled in its college of education, majoring in special education, with an emphasis in rehabilitation, planning to  earn a Master's Degree in rehabilitation counselling or disability studies.

Hughes was sufficiently impressed with Ryan's attitude, ability and performance that he wrote a letter of recommendation to Stephanie Wheeler, the head coach of the USA national women's wheelchair basketball team. Two weeks later, she  was one on 30 players invited to try out for the national teams at tryouts held in Birmingham, Alabama. In April, she was selected for the team, making her international debut in eight games against the German national team. She played with the national team at the 2014 Women's World Wheelchair Basketball Championship in Toronto. The United States came fourth.

In 2017, Ryan played for the Sydney Metro Blues in the Women's National Wheelchair Basketball League in Australia. The Blues went on to win the league championship.

In August 2019, Ryan became the assistant coach of the University of Arizona women's wheelchair basketball team.

Personal life
Ryan is a lesbian.

References

External links
 

1990 births
Living people
American women's wheelchair basketball players
People with paraplegia
Lesbian sportswomen
LGBT basketball players
American LGBT sportspeople
Basketball players from San Diego
American expatriate basketball people in Australia
Paralympic wheelchair basketball players of the United States
Wheelchair basketball players at the 2020 Summer Paralympics
Medalists at the 2020 Summer Paralympics
Paralympic bronze medalists for the United States
21st-century LGBT people
American women's soccer players
Soccer players from California
Women's association football defenders
Metro State Roadrunners women's soccer players
20th-century American women
21st-century American women